South East Staffordshire was a parliamentary constituency which returned one Member of Parliament (MP) to the House of Commons of the Parliament of the United Kingdom.  It was created for the 1983 general election, and abolished for the 1997 general election, when it was replaced by the new Tamworth constituency.

Boundaries 
The Borough of Tamworth, and the District of Lichfield wards of Alrewas, Bourne Vale, Fazeley, Little Aston, Mease Valley, Shenstone, Stonnall, Tame, and Whittington.

The main settlement in the constituency was the town of Tamworth; on the seat's abolition for the 1997 general election, it was transferred to the new seat of the same name.

Members of Parliament

Elections

Elections in the 1980s

Elections in the 1990s

Notes and references 

Parliamentary constituencies in Staffordshire (historic)
Constituencies of the Parliament of the United Kingdom established in 1983
Constituencies of the Parliament of the United Kingdom disestablished in 1997
Politics of Tamworth, Staffordshire